ProSiebenSat.1 Media SE (officially abbreviated as P7S1, formerly ProSiebenSat.1 Media AG) is a German mass media & digital company. It operates in three segments: Entertainment, Dating and Commerce & Ventures. The company is listed on the Frankfurt Stock Exchange.

History 

KirchMedia GmbH & Co. KGaA became the majority shareholder in ProSieben Media AG at the end of 1999. ProSieben Media AG and Sat.1 SatellitenFernsehen GmbH, which was also part of the Kirch group, merged in 2000. The company controlled various TV channels such as SAT.1, ProSieben and kabel eins.

Collapse of the Kirch group and takeover by Haim Saban 
The company nearly merged with KirchMedia GmbH in 2002, but the merger failed due to the insolvency of the Kirch group. The company's stock price crashed following the failed merger. In 2003 the company was bought out by P7S1 Holding, which 25-percent owned by Haim Saban's Saban Capital Group and other investors, who got an 88 percent voting share. Saban took over the TV channel group for 500 million euro. The remaining 12 percent belonged to Axel Springer AG.

After the takeover by P7S1 Holding the company was restructured and some TV shows were cancelled.

The company's TV channels, aimed at an age group of 14 to 49 year-old had a market share of more than 30 percent and earned of 1.8 billion euro in 2002, making a profit of 21 million euro. In the same year, the company had over three thousand employees.

When chairman Urs Rohner left the company up to 30 April 2004 "at his own request", Guillaume de Posch, a Belgian, became the new chairman.

In 2005 Axel Springer Verlag offered to buy the company for three billion euro, but this purchase was blocked by the Federal Cartel Office and the Commission on Concentration in the Media,. Springer announced withdrew its offer on 31 January 2006.

Takeover by Permira and KKR 

Haim Saban's shareholding was bought by Permira, a private equity company and Kohlberg Kravis Roberts (KKR) for about three billion euro on 14 December 2006. The shareholding was merged with Permira and KKR's other European media shareholding SBS Broadcasting Group from Luxemburg.  SBS was made up of 19 private TV channels, 20 pay TV channels and radio stations.

50.5 percent of the stock have got 88 percent of the voting rights. The rest - 49.5 percent - of the stock are listed on the stock exchange and in free float.

In the summer of 2007, ProSiebenSat.1 took 100 percent ownership in SBS for 3.3 billion euro and became in this way to the second biggest television broadcaster in Europe with yearly revenues of 3.1 billion euro. On 16 July 2007 the concern announced the reduction of 180 jobs (100 of which in Berlin and 80 in Munich) until 2009. On the same day two boulevard shows at Sat.1 were cancelled. Subsequently, further news shows were also to be cancelled or downsized.

On 10 December 2007 the Axel Springer AG announced a complete pull-out from ProSiebenSat.1 and the sale of their holding consisting of 12% of common stock and preferred stock to KKR and Permira for 500 million euro. This transaction was concluded on 16 January 2008. Therefore, the Lavena Holding 5 which was jointly controlled by KKR and Permira got 5% of the common stock as well as 25% of the non-preferred stock.

Upon the takeover of SBS by ProSiebenSat1 in Summer 2007 KKR and Permira offered an option to the other owner, Telegraaf Media Groep (TMG), for 12% of the common stock if they renounce their right of preemption. In June 2008 TMG announced going into the company without their right of preemption. This deal concluded in August of the same year.

At the end of 2008, Guillaume de Posch left the company at his own request. On 1 March 2009, Thomas Ebeling became the manager of the concern. He left the company in February 2018 and will be replaced by Max Conze on 1 June 2018. In the meantime Conrad Albert is taking over the management.

In October 2009, the TV channel group had debts totaling more than 3.4 billion euro and they only paid the taxes for the loan. The group saved especially on program expenditures.

On 12 January 2011, Permira and KKR announced the sale of 8 million non-voting shares. That made up 3.7 percent of the capital stock. After finishing the bookbuilding process (according to their own disclosures) they are going to have 53 percent of the capital stock.

On 20 April 2011 ProSiebenSat.1 wanted to sell their TV channels in Belgium and the Netherlands for 1.225 billion euro to an international media group led by the Finnish concern Sanoma. The sale concluded on 29 July 2011.

On 14 December 2012, the ProSiebenSat.1 Media AG announced the sale of the whole portfolio in Scandinavia to the American Discovery Communications Inc. Not included in the deal were the production companies, which are grouped as the Red Arrow Entertainment Group. With the proceeds they wanted to pay off 500 million euro in debt as well as increase the dividend to about 5.60 Euro per share (total of 1.2 billion euro). Besides, the ProSiebenSat.1 Media AG wanted to reorganize their stock plan, so that all shares bought on the stock market could be traded.

In the middle of February 2013, the capital investors Permira and KKR started to sell all preferred shares in  Lavena Holding 1, which amounts to 18 percent. The stock packet was sold at the Frankfurt Stock Exchange for close to 485 million euro (24.60 euro per share). This way, all preferred shares or half of the capital stock are now in free float.

On 9 April 2013, the announced sale of the Scandinavian company from December 2012 was closed with a value of 1.325 billion euro.

Exit of KKR and Permira 

At the Annual general meeting at 23 July 2013 the Shareholder of the ProSiebenSat.1 Media AG decided to combine the preferred stocks and the KKR and Permira common stocks. In this way only the entitled votes can be traded at Frankfurt Stock Exchange. KKR and Permira got only a minority by 44% of the common stocks, because the authorized capital contains 50% common stocks and 50% preferred stocks. The capital investors also decided with the Telegraaf Media Groep to sell their interest in tranches at the stock exchange.

At 19 August 2013 the ProSiebenSat.1 Media AG finished its stock exchange launch, so that future common stocks will be listed in MDAX and the exchange council doubles.

At 4 and 6 September Lavenda Holding and Telegraaf Media Groep sold 17 percent of their stocks to institutional investors. Therefore, the stocks packet of KKR and Permira decreases to 33 percent and the Telegraaf Media Groep sold their stocks package and isn't stockholder anymore.

At the end of 2013 ProSiebenSat.1 announced the sale of the rest of its Eastern Europe holdings. The Hungarian TV channels will be sold in a Management-Buy-Out. In Romania all TV and radio channels, except for Prima TV, which should be acquired by the Romanian businessman Cristian Burci and accepted by Greek Antenna Group. The takeovers were done in the first quarter of 2014. ProSiebenSat.1 acquired Gretzer Partners on Jan 2014 to expand global media footprint.

On 17 January 2014, KKR and Permira sold their last interest so they aren't stockholders anymore.

The entrance of Mediaset 

In May 2019, the Italian Mediaset (Mediaset S.p.A.) invests 330 million euros to take over 9.6% of ProSiebenSat.1 without having a role in the management. In November 2019 Mediaset rises to 15.1% of the German broadcaster. The transaction took place through the subsidiary Mediaset España, which acquired a 5.5% stake in the capital, which is added to the shares already in the group's portfolio. On 23 March 2020 Mediaset España purchased a further 4.28% of the share capital equal to 4.35% of the voting rights, bringing Mediaset's stake to 20.1% and showing the ambition to want to participate in the governance of the issuer thanks also to the 10% held by the Czech magnate Daniel Křetínský, considered by analysts to be close to Pier Silvio Berlusconi in this match, in order to form a European pole of generalist TV. A few days later, on 28 March, the CEO of the company, Max Conze, always cold to a possible alliance with Mediaset, resigned surprisingly at the end of a very heated board of directors. In his place Rainer Beaujean takes over with the task of guiding the group to a return to its origins, thus aiming at generalist TVs and in fact disavowing the diversification in ecommerce launched in recent years by Conze.

On 19 March 2018 the company was removed from the DAX stock market index, and listed in the MDAX.

Divisions

German-language free-to-air and pay-TV channels

Former channels 
sonnenklar.TV was sold to BigXtra in September 2005. The pan-Nordic C More Entertainment pay-TV operation (15 linear TV channels) was sold to TV4 in January 2009. 9Live was a commercial German participation TV channel launched on 1 September 2001 and lasted until 9 August 2011. Sat.1 Comedy was replaced by Sat.1 Emotions in 2012.

Red Arrow Studios 

The group includes Studio71, which was started in Berlin in 2013 as a German-language multi-channel network by Sebastian Weil and Ronald Horstman, and later acquired an American competitor, Collective Digital Studio. In January 2017, the French TF1 and Italian Mediaset networks acquired a 30% stake in Studio71.

In December 2017, Studio71 and over 15 other companies were merged to create Red Arrow Studios.

In 2020, Red Arrow Entertainment purchased a majority interest in the US company, Gravitas Ventures, a Cleveland, Ohio-based distributor of independent films and documentaries, primarily as video on demand (VOD). Gravitas maintained its management and staff and continues to operate independently and will cooperate with Red Arrow International, the company's distribution operation.

Divisions and partial subsidiaries include:
Fabrik Entertainment (United States)
Gravitas Ventures (United States; independent film distributor)
Half Yard Productions (United States)
Kinetic Content (United States)
Left/Right Productions (United States)
Karga Seven Pictures (United States)
Karga Seven Turkey
July August Productions (Israel)
NERD (United Kingdom)
CPL Productions (United Kingdom)
Nit Television (joint venture with Harry Hill)
Snowman Productions (Denmark)
Endor Productions (United Kingdom)
Redseven Entertainment (Germany)
Redseven Brand & Digital Studio
Ripple Entertainment (United States)
Band of Outsiders (United States)
Dorsey Pictures (United States)
Cove Pictures (United Kingdom/United States; joint venture with Smuggler, Inc.)
10Fold (United States; joint venture with Craig Armstrong and Rick Ringbakk)
44 Blue Productions (United States)
Mad Rabbit (Canada/United States; joint venture with Kari Skogland)

eCommerce 

The company formed NuCom in 2018, and soon after sold a 24.9% stake to General Atlantic, a private equity firm. In October 2018 Nucom bought eHarmony, an American dating website; it already held 94% of the similar German platform Parship.

References

External links 

 
German-language television networks
Television in Denmark
Television networks in Germany
Mass media companies of Germany
Companies based in Bavaria
Pan-European media companies
Private equity portfolio companies
Kohlberg Kravis Roberts companies
Mass media in Munich
2000 establishments in Germany
Companies in the MDAX